The following is the list of purpose-built passenger jet airliners.  It excludes turboprop and reciprocating engine powered airliners.  It also excludes business jets and aircraft designed primarily for the transportation of air cargo.

Currently in production

Out of production

Historical

See also

 List of regional airliners

Notes

References

Bibliography 
 
 
 
 
 
 

Lists of aircraft by power source
Lists of aircraft by role
Airliners